Flames is a 1932 American pre-Code drama film directed by Karl Brown and starring Johnny Mack Brown, George Cooper and Noel Francis. It follows the adventures of two young firefighters and the girlfriends they meet after rescuing their stranded cat.

Cast
 Johnny Mack Brown as Charlie 
 George Cooper as Fishey 
 Noel Francis as Pat 
 Marjorie Beebe as Gertie 
 Richard Tucker as Garson 
 Russell Simpson as Jake 
 Patricia Caron as Miss La Rue 
 Kit Guard as Pete
 Fred Parker as Henderson 
 Fred 'Snowflake' Toones as Janitor

References

Bibliography
 Don Miller. "B" Movies: An Informal Survey of the American Low-budget Film, 1933-1945. Curtis Books, 1973.

External links

1932 films
1932 drama films
American drama films
Films directed by Karl Brown
Monogram Pictures films
American black-and-white films
1930s English-language films
1930s American films